Honoria (minor planet designation: 236 Honoria) is a large main belt asteroid that was discovered by Austrian astronomer Johann Palisa on 26 April 1884 in Vienna. The asteroid was named after Honoria, granddaughter of the Roman Emperor Theodosius I, who started negotiations with Attila the Hun.

Polarimetric study of this asteroid reveals anomalous properties that suggests the regolith consists of a mixture of low and high albedo material. This may have been caused by fragmentation of an asteroid substrate with the spectral properties of CO3/CV3 carbonaceous chondrites.

References

External links
 The Asteroid Orbital Elements Database
 Minor Planet Discovery Circumstances
 Asteroid Lightcurve Data File
 
 

Background asteroids
Honoria
Honoria
S-type asteroids (Tholen)
L-type asteroids (SMASS)
18840426